Mikhail Solomonovich Abramovich (1859–1940) was a Russian poet and translator. He was the son of Mendele Mocher Sforim.

Biography
Mikhail Abramovich was born in Berditchev to Pesya and S. Y. Abramovich (Mendele Mocher Sforim). He was educated at the Zhitomir gymnasium, though he did not graduate.

In the fall of 1878 he went to St. Petersburg to enrol in the Military Medical Academy. Being implicated in a revolutionary movement, however, he was banished to the Archangel Governorate, then to Samara and Kazan. On his return, he graduated from the Faculty of Law of the University of Saint Petersburg in 1887, and from 1901 practised law.

His earliest poems appeared in Voskhod, Nedyelya, and other periodicals, on general and Jewish subjects. A collection of his poetry was published in book form in 1889. Soon after, Abramovich informally married the playwright Manefa de Fréville, daughter of the provincial secretary of the State Loan Bank in Riga. Years later, however, when their son Vsevolod was refused admission to school on the basis of the law on illegitimate children, Abramovich decided to be baptized so that they could legally marry. According to some sources, he returned to Judaism after their divorce.

Abramovich left Russia after the October Revolution. He died in Brussels in 1940.

Reception
Abramovich's poetry does not appear to have won critical acclaim. In the Jewish Encyclopedia, Herman Rosenthal comments that "excepting those devoted to Judaism or that treat of Biblical subjects his poems do not exhibit much originality." Literary critic  writes, "He was clearly imitating Frug, but the monotonous rhyming reflections lacked the lightness and melody that characterized the best of Frug's poems."

Publications

References
 

1859 births
1940 deaths
Jewish poets
Jewish writers from the Russian Empire
Lawyers from the Russian Empire
Male writers from the Russian Empire
People from Berdychiv
People from Berdichevsky Uyezd
Poets from the Russian Empire
Saint Petersburg State University alumni